Peter Vandenberg born Piet van Den Berg (September 2, 1935 – August 1987) was a Dutch born Australian international speedway rider.

Speedway career 
Vandenberg rode in the top tier of British Speedway from 1959 to 1970, riding for various clubs. He gained two Australian caps and three British caps, when riders from Oceania were allowed to represent Great Britain.

References 

1935 births
1987 deaths
Australian speedway riders
Aldershot Shots riders
Ipswich Witches riders
Newport Wasps riders
Poole Pirates riders
Southampton Saints riders
Wolverhampton Wolves riders
Sportspeople from Leiden